Brooks is thought to have been derived from both the Swedish surname Bäckland, (bäck, "brook", "stream") and lund ("grove"); and in English, Gaelic and Scottish from "of the brook". The word brook derives from the Old English broc and appears in the Medieval predecessors of Brooks (Ate-Broc and Atte-Broc). The surname arrived in North America from England in the mid-seventeenth century.

The surname Brooks is recorded in Ireland from the 1600s. O'Laughlin reports that "some of the name could stem from Irish origins, the name being changed into the English word 'Brook' or Brooks." The surname is also found among English-speaking Ashkenazi Jews, deriving from the male Hebrew given name Boruch ("blessed").

A
A. Brooks (Middlesex cricketer) (born ), English cricketer
Aaron Brooks (disambiguation), several people
Abraham Brooks (1852–1925), English cricketer
Adam Brooks (disambiguation), several people
Adrian Brooks (born 1957), English soccer player
Ahmad Brooks (born 1984), American football linebacker
Ahmad D. Brooks (born 1980), American football player and sports broadcaster
Aimee Brooks (born 1974), American actress
Albert Brooks (born 1947), American actor, comedian, and director
Alden Brooks (1882–1964), American writer
Alex Brooks (born 1976), American ice hockey player
Alexandra Brooks (born 1995), English footballer
Alfred Brooks (disambiguation), several people
Alison Brooks (born 1962), Canadian architect
Allan Brooks (1869–1946), Canadian ornithologist and bird artist
Allette Brooks (fl. 1996–2001), American folk singer
Allison Brooks (1917–2006), American aviator
Alvin Brooks, American basketball coach
Alvin Brooks III, American basketball coach
Amanda Brooks (born 1981), American actress
Amber Brooks (born 1991), American soccer player
Ameal Brooks (1904–1971), American baseball player
Andy Brooks, British Communist leader
Angel Brooks, character on the Australian soap opera Home and Away
Angela Brooks, American architect, partner in Brooks + Scarpa
Angelle Brooks (born 1967), American actress
Angie Brooks (1928–2007), Liberian diplomat and jurist
Annabel Brooks (born 1962), British actress
Anne Brooks (born 1938), American physician and nun
Anne Rose Brooks (born 1963), American actress
Anthony Brooks (1922–2007), British undercover agent
Anthony Michael Brooks (born 1993), American speedcuber
Antoine Brooks (born 1997), American football player
April Brooks, the real name of professional wrestler AJ Lee
Archie Brooks, fictional character from the British soap opera Emmerdale
Art Brooks, see Arthur Brooks (disambiguation)
Arthur Brooks (disambiguation), several people
Audrey Brooks (1933–2018), British botanist
Avery Brooks (born 1948), American film/TV actor

B
Barney Brooks, American physician
Barrett Brooks, American football player
Barry Brooks (disambiguation), several people
Beau Brooks, member of The Janoskians
Ben Brooks, see Benjamin Brooks (disambiguation)
Benjamin Brooks (disambiguation), several people
Berry Boswell Brooks (1902–1976), American cotton broker and big-game hunter
Bert Brooks (1920–1968), Canadian race car driver
Beverley Brooks, stage name of British actress Pamela Harmsworth, Viscountess Rothermere
Bill Brooks (disambiguation), several people
Billy Brooks (born 1953), American football player
Bob or Bobby Brooks, see Robert Brooks (disambiguation)
Bonnie Brooks (born 1953), Canadian department store executive
Bradley Brooks, darts player
Brandon Brooks (disambiguation), several people
Brendan Brooks (born 1978), Canadian ice hockey player
Brittany Brooks (born 1985), American musician
Bruce Brooks (born 1950), American author
Bryant Butler Brooks, American politician
Bubba Brooks (1922–2002), American saxophonist
Bucky Brooks (born 1971), American sportswriter
Bud Brooks, American football player
Byron Alden Brooks, author of the 1893 novel Earth Revisited

C
Carlos Brooks, writer and director of the 2008 movie Quid Pro Quo
Caroline Shawk Brooks (1840–1913), American sculptor
Cat Brooks, American activist
Cecil Brooks III, American jazz drummer
Cecil Joslin Brooks (1875–1953), British metallurgical chemist and naturalist
Cedric Brooks (1943–2013), Jamaican saxophonist and flautist
Chandler McCuskey Brooks (1905–1989), American physiologist
Charles Brooks (disambiguation), several people
Charlie Brooks (born 1981), Welsh actress
Charlie Brooks (racehorse trainer) (born 1963), British racehorse trainer
Charlotte Brooks (1918–2014), American photojournalist
Charmaine Brooks (born 1970), Canadian singer-songwriter
Chase Brooks, American soccer player and coach
Cherryl Brooks, fictional character from Atlas Shrugged
Chet Brooks (born 1966), American football player
Chris Brooks (disambiguation), several people
Clifford Cleveland Brooks, American politician
Cindy Brooks (model) (born 1951), American model and actress
Cindy Brooks (rower) (born 1965), American rower
Claire Brooks (1931–2008), British politician
Cleanth Brooks (1906–1994), American literary critic
Clifford Brooks (born 1949), American football player
Clive Brooks (1949–2017), English drummer
Coby G. Brooks (born 1969), American businessman
Colin Brooks (disambiguation), several people
Collin Brooks (1893–1959), British journalist, writer and broadcaster
Conrad Brooks (1931–2017), American actor
Curtis Brooks (born 1998), American football player
Constance "Connie" Brooks (see Our Miss Brooks), fictional English language teacher
Corey Brooks, American politician

D
D. W. Brooks (1901–1969), American farmer and businessman
Dallas Brooks, Australian general and politician
Daniel Brooks, American clothier, one of the Brooks Brothers
Daniel Brooks (born 1958), Canadian theatre director, actor and playwright
Danny Brooks (born 1951), Canadian blues musician
Darin Brooks, American actor
Darren Brooks (born 1982), American professional basketball player
David Brooks (disambiguation), several people
Dean Brooks (1916–2013), American physician and actor
Deanna Brooks, American model
Delray Brooks (born 1965), American basketball player and coach
De'Mon Brooks, (born 1992), American basketball player
Derreck Brooks (born 1994), American professional basketball player
Derrick Brooks (born 1973), American professional football player
Derrius Brooks (born 1988), American football player
Desley Brooks, American politician
Dianne Brooks (1939–2005), American jazz singer
Dick or Dickie Brooks, see Richard Brooks (disambiguation)
Dillon Brooks (born 1996), Canadian basketball player
Dolores "LaLa" Brooks (born 1947), former member of girl group The Crystals
Don Frank Brooks (1947–2000), American blues harmonica player
Donald Brooks, American fashion designer
Donnie Brooks (1936–2007), American pop music singer
Douglas Jackson Brooks (born 1956), American country music singer, known as Doug Stone
Dudley Brooks (1913–1989), American jazz pianist
Durant Brooks (born 1985), American football player
Dustin Brooks, from Power Rangers Ninja Storm
Dustin Brooks, from Zoey 101
Duwayne Brooks (born 1974), English politician

E
Earl Brooks (1929–2010), American race car driver
Earl Brooks, title character of the film Mr. Brooks
Ed Brooks, see Edward Brooks (disambiguation)
Edgar Brooks (1914–1986), English rugby league footballer
Edmund Wright Brooks (1834–1928), English Quaker philanthropist and cement maker
Edward Brooks (disambiguation), several people
Edwin Brooks (born 1929), British-Australian politician and academic
Edwin B. Brooks (1868–1933), American politician
Edwy Searles Brooks (1889–1965), British novelist
Elbridge Streeter Brooks (1846–1902), American author, editor and critic
Elisabeth Brooks (1951–1997), Canadian actress
Elisha Brooks, American clothier, one of the Brooks Brothers
Elizabeth Carter Brooks (1867–1951), American architect, educator and social activist
Elkie Brooks (born 1945), British singer
Ellen Brooks (born 1946), American photographer
Elmore Brooks (1918–1963), American blues guitarist, better known as Elmore James
Erastus Brooks (1815–1886), New York newspaper editor and politician
Eric Brooks (disambiguation), several people
Ernest Brooks (disambiguation), several people
Errol Brooks (born 1951), Antiguan bishop
Ethan Brooks (born 1972), American football player
Eugene C. Brooks (1871–1947), American educator

F
Farmer Brooks, Canadian professional wrestler
Foster Brooks, American comedian
Francis Gerard Brooks (1924–2010), Northern Irish Roman Catholic bishop
Francis K. Brooks (born 1943), American educator and politician
Frank Brooks (disambiguation), several people
Frank Leonard Brooks, Canadian artist
Frankie Brooks, fictional character in the Australian soap opera Home and Away
Franklin E. Brooks (1860–1916), American politician
Frederick Brooks (disambiguation), also includes Fred and Freddie Brooks

G
Gabriel Brooks (1704–1741), English calligrapher
Gabrielle Brooks (born 1990), English actress
Gareth Brooks (born 1979), New Zealand field hockey player
Garrison Brooks (born 1999), American basketball player
Garth Brooks (born 1962), American country musician
Gary Brooks (born 1980), Jamaican Association football player
Gene Edward Brooks (1931–2004), American judge
George Brooks (disambiguation), several people
Georgia Brooks, fictional character from the soap opera Neighbours
Gerald Brooks (1905–1974), Belizean bishop
Geraldine Brooks (disambiguation), several people
Glenn Brooks, Canadian politician
Golden Brooks, American actress
Gordon Brooks (disambiguation), several people
Greg Brooks (disambiguation), several people
Gregory Brooks, American poker player
Guy Brooks, American fiddle player
Gwendolyn Brooks, (1917–2000), award-winning African American woman poet

H
H. Allen Brooks (1925–2010), American architectural historian
H. H. Brooks, co-founder of the Herff-Brooks Corporation
Hadda Brooks, American pianist
Halbert W. Brooks (born 1985), American politician
Hannibal Brooks, fictional character from the film of the same name
Harold Brooks (disambiguation), several people
Harriet Brooks, Canadian physicist
Harry Brooks (disambiguation), several people
Harvey Brooks (bassist), American bassist
Harvey Brooks (physicist) (1915–2004), American physicist
Harvey Oliver Brooks (1899–1968), American pianist and composer
Hazel Brooks (1924–2002), American actress
Helen Brooks, pseudonym of the British novelist Rita Bradshaw
Hellen M. Brooks, American educator and politician
Henderson Brooks, Indian general, co-author of the Henderson Brooks–Bhagat Report
Henry Brooks (disambiguation), several people
Herb Brooks, American ice hockey coach
Hillery Brooks, American planter, for whom Brooks, Georgia, was named
Holly Brooks (born 1982), American skier
Holly Brooks, fictional character on the TV show Malcolm & Eddie
Horace Brooks (1814–1894), American army officer
Horatio G. Brooks, American rail engineer
Hubert Brooks (1921–1984), Canadian air force officer and hockey player
Hubie Brooks, American baseball player

I
Ian James Brooks (1928–2022), New Zealand politician
Irvin Brooks (1891–1966), American baseball player

J
J. Brooks (fl. 1892), English cricketer
J. Stewart Brooks (1910–2000), Canadian politician
J. Twing Brooks (1884–1956), U.S. congressman from Pennsylvania
Jack Brooks (disambiguation), several people
Jade Brooks, Canadian author and activist
Jai Brooks, member of Australian group "The Janoskians"
Jamal Brooks (born 1976), American football player
James Brooks (disambiguation), several people
Jamie Brooks (born 1983), English football player
Janice Young Brooks, birth name of American mystery writer Jill Churchill
Jarred Brooks, American mixed martial artist, currently fights at ONE Championship
Jason Brooks (disambiguation), several people
Jay Brooks, fictional character from the movie I'm Through with White Girls (The Inevitable Undoing of Jay Brooks)
JC Brooks, lead singer of JC Brooks & the Uptown Sound
Jean Brooks, American actress
Jeff Brooks (born 1989), American-Italian basketball player
Jeffrey Brooks (born 1956), American composer
Jehiel Brooks (1797–1886), American soldier and politician
Jeremy Brooks (1926–1994), British writer
Jerry Brooks (born 1967), American baseball player
Jerry Brooks (born 1966), American actor and writer, known by the stage name J. B. Smoove
Jess Lee Brooks (1894–1944), American actor
Jessica Brooks (born 1981), English actress
Jim or Jimmy Brooks, see James Brooks (disambiguation)
Joanna Brooks, American author and professor
Jody Brooks, American country music singer, better known as Jody Miller
Joe Brooks, see Joseph Brooks (disambiguation)
Joel Brooks (born 1949), American actor
John Brooks (disambiguation), several people
John J. Brooks, American lawman
Johnny Brooks (1931–2016), English footballer
Jon Brooks (disambiguation), several people
Jordyn Brooks (born 1997), American football player
Joseph Brooks (disambiguation), several people
Joshua Brooks (disambiguation), several people
Josh Brooks, College athletic director
Josie Brooks, fictional character from the British soap opera Brookside
Juanita Brooks, American writer
Julia Evangeline Brooks (1882–1948), American educator
Justin Brooks (born 1965), American attorney

K
Karen Brooks (born 1954), American country music singer
Karen Brooks (author), Australian fantasy author
Kate Brooks (born 1977), American photojournalist
Kate Brooks (astronomer), Australian astronomer
Katherine Brooks (born 1976), American film writer and director
Keion Brooks Jr. (born 2000), American basketball player
Kendra Brooks, American politician
Kennedy Brooks (born 1998), American football player
Kevin Brooks (disambiguation), several people
Kimberly Brooks (born 1968), American actress
Kix Brooks (born 1955), American country musician from Brooks & Dunn
Koleen Brooks (born 1965), American politician and model
Kristi Brooks, American science fiction author
K. S. Brooks (born 1963), American writer and photographer

L
Lance Brooks (born 1984), American discus thrower
Larry Brooks (disambiguation)
Lawrence Brooks (fl. 1940s–1960s), American singer and actor
Lawrence Brooks (1909–2022), American veteran
Lee Brooks (born 1983), American composer
Lela Brooks (1908–1990), Canadian skater
Leo Brooks (1947–2002), American football player
Leo A. Brooks Jr. (born 1957), American general
Leo A. Brooks Sr., American general
Leslie Brooks (1922–2011), American actress
Lexie Brooks, fictional character on the American soap opera Days of Our Lives
Linton Brooks (born 1938), American diplomat
Linus Brooks, early settler in Brooks, Oregon
Lonnie Brooks (1933–2017), American blues musician
Lorie Brooks, fictional character on the soap opera The Young and the Restless
Louise Brooks (1906–1985), American actress and dancer
Louise Cromwell Brooks, American socialite
Louise Susannah Brooks, fictional character from the British sitcom Two Pints of Lager and a Packet of Crisps
Lucy Ann Brooks (1835-1926), English temperance advocate
Luke Brooks (born 1994), Australian rugby league footballer
Luke Brooks (singer), member of the Australian group The Janoskians
Lyall Brooks (born 1978), Australian actor
Lydia Brooks (1818–1905), Labradorian diarist, better known by her married name, Lydia Campbell
Lyman Brooks (1910–1984), American educator

M
Macey Brooks (born 1975), American football player
Malcolm Brooks (1930–2020), Australian politician
Mandy Brooks (1897–1976), American baseball player
Maria Gowen Brooks, American poet
Marion E. Brooks, American environmentalist, for whom Marion Brooks Natural Area was named
Mark Brooks (disambiguation), several people
Marshall Brooks, British sportsman
MarShon Brooks (born 1989), American basketball player
Martha Brooks (born 1944), Canadian writer
Martin E. Brooks (1925–2015), American actor
Marva Jean Brooks, Muddy Waters's wife
Mary Brooks (1907–2002), director of the U.S. Mint
Matilda Moldenhauer Brooks (1888–1981), American botanist
Maurice Brooks, American naturalist
Max Brooks, American novelist
McKenna Brooks, fictional character from American Girl
Mehcad Brooks, American actor
Mel Brooks (born 1926), American comic actor, writer, director, and theatrical producer
Meredith Brooks (born 1958), American musician
Merv Brooks (1919–2011), Australian rules football player
Micah Brooks (1775–1857), American politician
Michael Brooks (disambiguation), several people
Michele Brooks, American politician
Mike Brooks, see Michael Brooks (disambiguation)
Milton Brooks (1901–1956), American photographer
Mo Brooks (born 1954), American politician
Morgan Brooks (1861–1947), American engineer
Myra Brooks Turner (1936-2017), American composer, educator, and writer

N
Nan Brooks, American illustrator
Natalie Brooks, American school shooting victim
Nate Brooks (1933–2020), American boxer, gold medalist at the 1952 Olympics
Nate Brooks (American football) (born 1996), American football player
Nathan Eugene Brooks (1933–2020), American boxer
Nathan C. Brooks, American educator
Ned Brooks, American broadcaster
Neil Brooks, Australian swimmer
Nicole Paige Brooks, contestant on American reality TV show RuPaul's Drag Race (season 2)
Nigel Brooks (born 1936), English composer
Noah Brooks, American journalist
Noel Edgell Brooks, Canadian railway engineer, for whom Brooks, Alberta, was named
Nona L. Brooks (1861–1945), American minister
Norman Brooks (disambiguation), several people

O
Oland J. Brooks, American financier, founder of Brooks Steam Motors
Oliver Brooks, British soldier
Oswald Brooks (born ), Jamaican trumpet player
Overton Brooks, American politician

P
Pamela Brooks (born 1966), British writer
Pamela Brooks (born 1956), American composer and performer, known by the stage name Pamela Z
Patricia Brooks (1937–1993), American opera singer
Pattie Brooks, American singer
Patty Brooks, fictional character in the American TV show 24
Paul Brooks (born 1959), British film producer
Paul Brooks (author) (1909–1998), American nature writer and editor
Paul Brooks (cricketer) (1921–1946), English cricketer
Paula Brooks, fictional DC Comics supervillain
Paula Brooks (politician) (born 1953), American politician
Perry Brooks (1954–2010), American football player
Peter Brooks (disambiguation), several people
Philip Brooks (disambiguation), several people
Phillips Brooks, American Episcopalian bishop and writer
Phyllis Brooks (1915–1995), American actress and model
Preston Brooks, American politician
Priest Joseph Brooks (born 1972), American hip hop producer and rapper, known by the stage name Soopafly

Q
Quincy Brooks IV (born 1977), American rapper, known by the stage name San Quinn

R
R. L. Brooks, American singer-guitarist in the band Flee the Seen
R. Leonard Brooks, British mathematician
Ralph D. Brooks, Colorado School of Mines benefactor, for whom Brooks Field was named
Ralph G. Brooks, American politician
Ramy Brooks, American dog racer
Rand Brooks (1918–2003), American actor
Randy Brooks (disambiguation), several people
Ray Brooks (disambiguation), several people
Rayshard Brooks, African American fatally shot by police in Atlanta
Rebekah Brooks, British journalist
Reggie Brooks (born 1971), American football player
Reva Brooks (1913–2004), Canadian photographer
Rich Brooks, see Richard Brooks (disambiguation)
Richard Brooks (disambiguation), several people
Rob Brooks, American ice hockey team owner
Robert Brooks (disambiguation), several people
Robin Brooks (disambiguation), several people
Rodney Brooks (born 1954), director of the MIT Computer Science and Artificial Intelligence Laboratory
Rodregis Brooks (born 1978), American football player
Romaine Brooks, American painter
Ron Brooks (born 1988), American football player
Ron Brooks, American rapper, known by the stage name Money-B
Ronnie Brooks (Law & Order: UK), fictional character from Law & Order: UK
Ronnie Baker Brooks (born 1967), American blues guitarist
Rory and Elizabeth Brooks, British philanthropists after whom the Brooks World Poverty Institute was named
Rosa Brooks, American law professor
Ross Brooks (born 1937), Canadian ice hockey player
Roy Brooks (1938–2005), American jazz drummer
Ruby Brooks (1861–1906), American banjoist
Rusty Brooks (1958–2021), American professional wrestler
Ryan Brooks (born 1988) American basketball player

S
Sacha Brooks, British DJ
Samuel Brooks (disambiguation), including Sam and Sammy, several people
Scott Brooks (born 1965), American basketball player
Scott Martin Brooks (born 1972), American actor
Shanon Brooks, American university president
Shamarh Brooks (born 1988), Barbadian cricketer
Sharon Sanders Brooks, American politician from Missouri
Shauna Brooks (actress), American actress and artist
Sheila Brooks, American journalist
Sheldon Brooks (1811-1883), American businessman, physician, and politician
Shelton Brooks (1886–1975), American popular music composer
Shepher Brooks, owner of the Shepherd Brooks Estate
Sheri-Ann Brooks (born 1983), Jamaican sprinter
Shirley Brooks (1816–1874), English journalist and novelist
Shirley Brooks, plaintiff/appellee in Flagg Brothers, Inc. v. Brooks
Sidney Johnson Brooks Jr. (died 1917), American aviator for whom Brooks Air Force Base was named
Sierra Brooks (gymnast) (born 2001), American gymnast
Simon Brooks (disambiguation), several people
Siobhan Brooks (born 1972), American sociologist and activist
Stacy Brooks (born 1952), public critic of the Church of Scientology
Stan Brooks (radio broadcaster) (1927–2013), American radio broadcaster
Stanley Brooks, American film and television producer
Stella Brooks (1910–2002), American jazz vocalist
Stennett H. Brooks (died 2004), American pastor
Stephen Brooks (disambiguation), several people
Steve Brooks, see Stephen Brooks (disambiguation)
Stratton D. Brooks (1870–1949), American educator
Stuart M. Brooks (born 1936), American pulmonary doctor
Sue Brooks (born 1953), Australian film director and producer
Susan Brooks (born 1960), American politician
Susan Brooks, plaintiff in Brooks v. Canada Safeway Ltd.
Sydney Brooks (1872–1937), British author and critic
Sylvia Brooks, American jazz musician

T
Tamara Brooks (1941–2012), American choral conductor
Ted Brooks (1898–1960), English cricketer
Terrance Brooks (1963–2011), American football player and coach
Terrence Brooks (born 1991), American football player
Terron Brooks, American singer and actor
Terry Brooks (born 1944), American author
Terry Brooks (basketball), American basketball player
Theodore Marley Brooks, fictional character from Doc Savage
Thomas Brooks (disambiguation), several people
Tia Brooks (born 1990), American shot putter
Tiffany Brooks (baseball), American baseball player
Tim Brooks (disambiguation), several people
Timothy L. Brooks (born 1964), American attorney
Tina Brooks, American jazz saxophonist
Tom or Tommy Brooks, see Thomas Brooks (disambiguation)
Tony Brooks (racing driver) (1932–2022), British racing driver
Tony Brooks (American football) (born 1969), American football player
Tracey Brooks, American politician
Traci Brooks, Canadian professional wrestler
Travis Brooks, Australian field hockey player
Trevor Brooks (born 1975), British alleged terrorist, also known as Abu Izzadeen

V
Van Wyck Brooks, American writer
Vaushaun Brooks (born 1980), American hip hop record producer, known by the stage name Maestro
Vic Brooks (born 1948), English cricketer
Victor Brooks (actor) (1918–2000), English actor
Victor Brooks (athlete) (born 1941), Jamaican long jumper
Vincent Brooks (disambiguation), several people

W
Wallis Brooks, American politician
Walter Brooks (organist) (1837–1902), English organist
Walter Brooks (cricketer) (1884–1965), English cricketer and British Army officer
Walter R. Brooks, American children's writer
Wayne Baker Brooks, American blues musician
Wiley Brooks, founder of the Breatharian Institute of America
Wilks Brooks, owner of the Wilks Brooks House
Will Brooks (born 1986), American mixed martial artist
William Brooks (disambiguation), several people
Wyndham Brooks, pen name of American horror author Wayne Robbins

Z
Zoey Brooks, title character of the American TV show Zoey 101

Compound surnames
Harold Brooks-Baker, American journalist
Ruth Brooks Flippen (1921–1981), American screenwriter
Reginald Brooks-King (1861–1938), Welsh archer
Corrin Brooks-Meade (born 1988), English footballer
Renel Brooks-Moon (born 1958), American public address announcer
Ellenese Brooks-Simms, Louisiana school official
John Brooks Close-Brooks (1850–1914), English banker and amateur rower, who competed as John Brooks Close
Caroline St John-Brooks, British journalist and academic
Birnie Stephenson-Brooks, Guayanese judge

See also
Brooks baronets
Brooks–McFarland Feud
Brooks (disambiguation)
Brook (surname)
Brooke (surname)
Brookes (disambiguation)

References

English-language surnames
Surnames of English origin